Musar may refer to

 Jewish ethics
 Musar literature, Jewish moral literature
 Musar movement, a Jewish religious ethical, educational and cultural movement
 Château Musar, a Lebanese winery

See also
 Musa (disambiguation)